Lambton is an area of Washington, in the City of Sunderland metropolitan borough in Tyne and Wear, England. It is historically part of County Durham. It is linked to the Lambton family, Lambton Castle and is the legendary home of the Lambton Worm.

New Lambton is located just a few miles from the Lambton estate.

External links

Populated places in Tyne and Wear
Washington, Tyne and Wear